The Good Shepherd School in Grahamstown, Eastern Cape, South Africa is a public school on private property providing education for boys and girls from grade 1 to grade 7.

History 

The school was established by Mother Cecile of Grahamstown in October 1884 (though not in its present premises). Mother Cecile was the founder of the Community of the Resurrection of our Lord (also known as the CR Sisters).  In 1918, the CR Sisters purchased the current building in Huntley Street, and the Good Shepherd School moved into its current home.

The Huntley Street Building was built in 1844, and was—from 1849—the St. George's Grammar School. St. George's Grammar School was founded by Robert Gray, Bishop of Cape Town.  F. Bankes, a priest, was the first headmaster; he later became the first headmaster of St. Andrew's College.

The school is situated near the centre of the city's business area.  In spite of this, the school is populated predominantly by disadvantaged learners.  The school's medium of instruction is English.  The school caters for girls and boys from grade 1 to 7 (ages 6– 13).

Recent developments 

Through funds secured from PetroSA in 2010, the new classroom block was built and the administration block totally refurbished to provide for a staff room, library, computer lab, kitchen (from where the school nutrition programme is run), and a meeting room.

Good Shepherd School has a rich tradition as an Anglican school. As a Public School on Private Property, the Good Shepherd Trust has stewardship of the school buildings and property. The Good Shepherd Trust, along with the staff, the School Governing Body, and parents, is looking to provide excellent education by rediscovering the riches of the school’s tradition as a church school with a strong religious ethos as its foundation.

See also

Note and references

External links
 

Anglican schools in South Africa
Private schools in the Eastern Cape
Educational institutions established in 1884
Buildings and structures in Makhanda, Eastern Cape
1884 establishments in the Cape Colony
Schools in the Eastern Cape